Maaseide is a surname. Notable people with the surname include:

Bjørn Maaseide (born 1968), Norwegian beach volleyball player
Kathrine Maaseide (born 1976), Norwegian beach volleyball player, sister of Bjørn

Norwegian-language surnames